Hibbertia complanata is a species of flowering plant in the family Dilleniaceae and is endemic to the Northern Territory. It is a sub-shrub with two forms of erect, flattened stems, elliptic leaves and pinkish or creamy-white flowers arranged in leaf axils, with seven or eight stamens.

Description
There are seven or eight stamens and two staminodes arranged around the two carpels. Flowering occurs from March to September.

Taxonomy
This species was first formally described in 1817 by Augustin Pyramus de Candolle in his Regni Vegetabilis Systema Naturale from an unpublished description by Robert Brown and was given the name Pachynema complanatum. In 2009, James W. Horn changed the name to Hibbertia complanata in the International Journal of Plant Sciences on the basis of phylogenetic studies.

Distribution and habitat
Hibbertia complanata is relatively common in savanna in well-drained soil in the northern part of the Northern Territory.

Conservation status
Hibbertia complanata is classified as of "least concern" under the Northern Territory Government Territory Parks and Wildlife Conservation Act 1976.

See also
List of Hibbertia species

References

complanata
Flora of the Northern Territory
Plants described in 1817
Taxa named by Augustin Pyramus de Candolle